Eliza O'Flaherty (1 September 1818 – 2 December 1882) was an Australian writer and stage actress.

O'Flaherty was born on 1 September 1818 in Blackburn, Lancashire, England, daughter of William Winstanley and Eliza Finch, and emigrated to Australia with her family in 1833. She debuted at the Theatre Royal, Sydney, on 31 October 1834: this was the first theatre in Australia, newly opened, and she would thereby have belonged to the very first women active as professional actors in Australia. Her father was a decorator at the theatre, and her sister Ann was engaged as singer and dancer.

She married a theatre colleague, the actor Henry Charles O'Flaherty (d. 1854), in 1841. She managed the Olympic Theatre in Sydney with her spouse in 1842, where she caused a scandal by playing Richard III; at the time, women playing men's roles was not common in Australia, where theatre in itself had only recently been introduced.

O'Flaherty left Australia for England in 1846, where she enjoyed a successful acting career, performing privately for Queen Victoria on several occasions. She also toured the United States. She has been referred to as the first Australian actor to have an international career. She joined Charles Kean's London company in 1850.

Towards the end of her acting career, O'Flaherty started a new career as a writer, and by 1864 she had given up the stage entirely. She returned to Australia around 1880 and died in Sydney.

Works
 Lucy Cooper, anonymous, 1854
 Shifting Scenes in Theatrical Life, 1859
 Bitter-Sweet—So Is the World, as by Ariele, 1860
 Margaret Falconer, 1860
 Twenty Straws, London, 1864
Books as Mrs Eliza Winstanley:
 The Mistress of Hawk's Crag, 1864
 Voices From the Lumber Room, 1865
 The Humming Bird, 1865–66
 Desmond, or the Red Hand, 1866
 The Cockletop, 1866
 Carynthia, a Legend of Black Rock, 1866–67
 What Is To Be Will Be, London, 1867
 Who Did It?, 1867
 The Queen of Clitherly, 1867
 Astrutha, an Irish Story, 1867
 Entrances and Exits, 1868
 For Her Natural Life: A Tale of 1830, 1876
 Imogen Hubert, 1876

Magazines edited:
 Bow Bells: A Weekly Magazine of General Literature and Art, published by John Dicks
 Fiction for Family Reading, published by John Dicks

References

 N. M. Robinson, O'Flaherty, Eliza (1818–1882), Australian Dictionary of Biography, National Centre of Biography, Australian National University,published first in hardcopy 1967, accessed online 18 August 2017.

External links
  (see WorldCat, below)

1818 births
1882 deaths
Australian stage actresses
19th-century Australian actresses
19th-century Australian writers
19th-century Australian women writers